The Rajasthan Cricket Association (RCA), headquartered in Jaipur, is the governing body of Cricket in the state of Rajasthan. RCA administers the game of cricket in the Indian state of Rajasthan. The Rajasthan Cricket Association was founded in 1931 at Ajmer and was earlier known as the Rajputana.

It officiates over the state level cricket in Rajasthan and the Rajasthan cricket team. It selects the cricket team of the state of Rajasthan to play in Indian first class cricket, namely the Ranji Trophy, the Vijay Hazare trophy and the Duleep Trophy.

Vaibhav Gahlot is the incumbent President of the RCA. The Rajasthan Cricket Association is officially recognized by Board of Control for Cricket in India (BCCI) and affiliated to it.

History 

Formerly known as Rajputana, the Association was renamed to Rajasthan Cricket Association after the formation of the State of Rajasthan in 1956. Headed by Bhagwat Singh Mewar until 1972, it was controlled by the Rungta family from 1972 to 2004. Promulgation of a Sports legislation by the Government of Rajasthan resulted in Lalit Modi beating Rungta in the first ever contested election in 2005.

Former IPL chief Lalit Modi created a world-class infrastructure in Jaipur, restructuring the stadium and cricket academy. Changing political equations saw Lalit Modi lose by a wafer-thin margin to Sanjay Dixit in 2009. The Association was headed by CP Joshi as president and Sanjay Dixit as the Secretary. Lalit Modi won the election again in 2013, however legal disputes have marred his team's functioning in the last 2 years.

Rajasthan Cricket Association's Rajasthan cricket team won the Ranji Trophy in 2011 for the first time in the 77-year history of the tournament, by beating Baroda on 15 January 2011 at Vadodara. They gained another title win in the 2011/12 seasons. Prior to this, Rajasthan had finished runners-up eight times between 1960 and 1974.

Finance 

In a move to honor and help former Ranji players who have represented Rajasthan in the past, the RCA declared a monthly pension scheme for former players wherein players who have played 5 to 14 matches will be given Rs. 5,000 per month while players who have represented Rajasthan in 15 to 24 games, will be given an amount of Rs. 7,500. The Board of Control for Cricket in India (BCCI) gives monthly pension to players who have played at least 25 first-class games, hence this decision from the RCA comes as a godsend for former Rajasthan players who haven't represented their state in 25 first-class matches.

Administration 
Vaibhav Gahlot is the incumbent president and Mahendra Sharma is the secretary of Rajasthan Cricket Association. Various district cricket associations of Rajasthan are affiliated to the RCA.

Future development 
RCA do not have its own stadium like other most of the Indian state cricket boards have. It organize its domestic and international cricket matches at Sawai Mansingh Stadium, it is owned by the government of Rajasthan. On 5 February 2022 Rajasthan Cricket Association laid the foundation stone for its own cricket stadium. The stadium is planned to complete in 3 years. This stadium is going to be built near Jaipur-Delhi bypass Highway outside Jaipur in Chonp village. It is 25 kilometers away from Jaipur. It will have two practice grounds, which can be use for Ranji trophy matches. As per the RCA president Vaibhav Gahalot, this stadium will be world's third largest cricket stadium with 75,000 seating capacity. It will be the third largest cricket stadium in the world after Narendra Modi stadium and Melbourne Cricket Ground if compared on seating capacity. The estimated cost for the stadium is 300 cr. rupees.

References

External links 
Rajasthan Cricket Association website

Cricket administration in India
Organisations based in Jaipur
Cricket in Rajasthan
1956 establishments in Rajasthan
Sports organizations established in 1956